Peter Connellan (born 1936) is a retired Canadian football coach. He coached the University of Calgary Dinos football team from 1983 to 1995. Under his leadership, the Dinos won Canada West championships in 1977, 1983, 1984, 1985, 1988, 1992, 1993, and 1995, as well as the Vanier Cup championship in 1983, 1985, 1988, and 1995. Connellan was inducted into the Dinos' Hall of Fame in 2008, the Alberta Sports Hall of Fame in 1998, and the Canadian Football Hall of Fame in 2012. In 1977 and 1983, he won the Frank Tindall Trophy as the CIS coach of the year. He was also a professor in the department of physical education at the University of Calgary.

References

Alberta Sports Hall of Fame inductees
Canadian Football Hall of Fame inductees
Calgary Dinos football coaches
Academic staff of the University of Calgary
Year of birth uncertain